Brandon Mitchell (June 19, 1975) is a former American football defensive lineman who played nine seasons in the National Football League (NFL). He started in Super Bowl XXXVI for the New England Patriots.

His brother Jason Mitchell was a member of New York Giants. His cousin, Anthony Levine, played for the NFL's Baltimore Ravens from 2012 until his retirement in 2022.

References

1975 births
Living people
People from Abbeville, Louisiana
American football defensive ends
Texas A&M Aggies football players
New England Patriots players
Seattle Seahawks players